Lancer Spy is a 1937 American thriller film directed by Gregory Ratoff and starring Dolores Del Rio and George Sanders. Its plot concerns an Englishman who impersonates a German officer and a female German spy who falls in love with him.

Plot

Cast

Production
Lancer Spy was based on a story written by Marthe McKenna, a Belgian woman who was a spy for England during World War I. She had previously written the 1932 memoir I Was a Spy, the basis of a 1933 film of the same title.

Gregory Ratoff signed a contract with 20th Century Fox to write, produce and direct. The film was originally to star Michael Whalen in the part that was eventually played by George Sanders.

French actor Germaine Aussey was to have made her American debut in the film but was replaced by Dolores del Río soon after filming began in May 1937.

Peter Lorre was cast after his success in Think Fast, Mr Moto. Fox bought his contract from the Gaumont-British Picture Corporation.

Colin Clive, who had been cast in the film, collapsed during filming and died.

References

External links

1937 films
1930s spy thriller films
American spy thriller films
Films directed by Gregory Ratoff
Films with screenplays by Philip Dunne
American black-and-white films
20th Century Fox films
World War I spy films
Films set in London
Films set in Norfolk
Films set in Berlin
1930s English-language films
1930s American films